The 2003 NBA playoffs was the postseason tournament of the National Basketball Association's 2002–03 season. The tournament concluded with the Western Conference champion San Antonio Spurs defeating the Eastern Conference champion New Jersey Nets, 4 games to 2, in the NBA Finals. Tim Duncan was named NBA Finals MVP for the second time.

Overview
The 2003 Playoffs were notable for several reasons.
 This postseason featured the most series decided by six games in NBA Playoff history (Ironically, the Spurs won every single playoff series in six games en route to the championship).
 For the first time since 1974 that all series were conducted in a best-of-seven format. From 1984 to 2002, the first-round series were best-of-five. It is also notable as the only time the first round did not include any series sweeps.
 This is the first postseason that the NBA Playoffs carried more games on cable television than regular broadcast television, and marks the debut for the NBA Playoffs to be aired on NBA TV, and the return broadcast on ESPN and ABC after the NBA departed from NBC and TBS.
 This was the final postseason appearance for David Robinson, Steve Kerr, and John Stockton

Despite relocating to New Orleans in the offseason, the Hornets made their third consecutive postseason. After Charlotte reclaimed the Hornets name and pre 2002-03 history in 2014 (and the Pelicans claimed the Hornet’s history from 2002-03 onwards), this marked the first postseason for the New Orleans franchise.

The Portland Trail Blazers and Utah Jazz continued the longest active Western Conference playoff appearance streaks at the time, entering their twenty first and twentieth postseason appearances, respectively.

The Minnesota Timberwolves entered their seventh consecutive postseason. In addition, they were awarded home-court advantage for the first time in franchise history in their series against the Los Angeles Lakers.

The Orlando Magic became the seventh team to lose a playoff series despite leading 3-1, losing to the Detroit Pistons in the first round. The Magic would not win another playoff game again until 2008.

Game 5 of the Kings-Jazz series was the final game featuring Karl Malone and John Stockton as members of the Utah Jazz. Stockton would retire after the season while Malone would sign with the Lakers in the offseason. After this, the Jazz would not return to the playoffs until 2007.

With their first round series loss to the Los Angeles Lakers, the Minnesota Timberwolves earned the dubious distinction of making their first seven postseason appearances, only to lose in the first round. They would break that streak by winning their first playoff series the following postseason.

The Portland Trail Blazers snapped a ten game NBA Playoff losing streak dating back to 2000 with a Game 4 win in their first round series against the Dallas Mavericks. The Trail Blazers also became the third team in NBA History to force a Game 7 after trailing 0-3 before bowing out. They would not return to the playoffs until 2009. 

With their conference semifinals loss to the New Jersey Nets, the Boston Celtics were swept in a postseason series for the first time since 1983, and would not return to the Conference Semifinals until 2008.

With their conference semifinals loss to the San Antonio Spurs, the Lakers’ championship streak was snapped at 3. With the win, the Spurs returned to the Western Conference Finals for the third time in five seasons.

With their conference semifinals win over the Philadelphia 76ers, the Detroit Pistons advanced to the Eastern Conference Finals for the first time since the Isiah Thomas and Joe Dumars-led team was swept by the Chicago Bulls in 1991. The Pistons would go on to appear in six consecutive Eastern Conference Finals through 2008, the most consecutive appearances for any Eastern Conference team since the Bill Russell-led Boston Celtics (1956–69).

With their conference semifinals victory over the Sacramento Kings, the Dallas Mavericks made the conference finals for the first time since 1988.

This was the first Western Conference Finals since 1995 to take place entirely in the state of Texas.

With their Eastern Conference Finals sweep of the Detroit Pistons, the New Jersey Nets won ten straight postseason games, the most since the 2001 Los Angeles Lakers.

In Game 6 of the Spurs-Mavericks series, Steve Kerr and Manu Ginobli sparked a 42-15 run to help the Spurs advance to the NBA Finals for the first time since 1999. The Mavericks would not return to the Conference Finals (let alone face the Spurs in the playoffs) until 2006.

As of 2023, the 49-win New Jersey Nets are the most recent NBA Finals participant to win fewer than 50 games in an 82-game season. Four teams have since made the Finals with sub-50 win records, but each of those times, the season was shorter than 82 games for particular reasons:
 The Miami Heat (46 - 20) and the Oklahoma City Thunder (47 - 19) both made the 2012 Finals, but the 2011–2012 season was shortened to 66 games due to the 2011 NBA lockout.
 The Miami Heat (44 - 29) made the Finals in the 2019–2020 season, but that season was cut short due to the COVID-19 pandemic and no team played a full 82 game schedule.
 The Milwaukee Bucks (46 - 26) made it to the Finals in the 2020–2021 season, however that season was only 72 games long due to the COVID-19 pandemic.

Playoff qualifying

Western Conference

Eastern Conference

Bracket

First round

Eastern Conference first round

(1) Detroit Pistons vs. (8) Orlando Magic

The Pistons became the 7th team in NBA history to overcome a 3–1 series deficit and the first 1st seed to do so.

This was the second playoff meeting between these two teams, with the Magic winning the first meeting.

(2) New Jersey Nets vs. (7) Milwaukee Bucks

In Game 3, Rodney Rogers hits the game winner with 2 seconds left.

This was the third playoff meeting between these two teams, with the Bucks winning the first two meetings.

(3) Indiana Pacers vs. (6) Boston Celtics

This was the third playoff meeting between these two teams, with the Celtics winning the first two meetings.

(4) Philadelphia 76ers vs. (5) New Orleans Hornets

This was the first playoff meeting between the 76ers and the New Orleans Pelicans/Hornets franchise.

Western Conference first round

(1) San Antonio Spurs vs. (8) Phoenix Suns

In Game 1, after Amar'e Stoudemire banks in a game-tying 3 with 7.9 seconds left in regulation, Stephon Marbury hits the game-winning 3 at the buzzer in OT.

This was the sixth playoff meeting between these two teams, with the Suns winning three of the first five meetings.

(2) Sacramento Kings vs. (7) Utah Jazz

Game 5 is John Stockton's final NBA game. It was also Karl Malone's last game in Utah as he joined the Los Angeles Lakers during the following offseason.

This was the third playoff meeting between these two teams, with each team winning one series apiece.

(3) Dallas Mavericks vs. (6) Portland Trail Blazers

The Trail Blazers became the third NBA team to force a Game 7 after being down 0–3.

This was the third playoff meeting between these two teams, with the Trail Blazers winning the first two meetings.

(4) Minnesota Timberwolves vs. (5) Los Angeles Lakers

This was the first playoff meeting between the Lakers and the Timberwolves.

Conference semifinals

Eastern Conference semifinals

(1) Detroit Pistons vs. (4) Philadelphia 76ers

 In Game 5, Chucky Atkins hit the game-winning layup with 0.9 seconds left after Derrick Coleman was called for goaltending on the shot

This was the second playoff meeting between these two teams, with the 76ers winning the first meeting, which occurred when the Nationals/76ers franchise were in Syracuse and the Pistons franchise were in Fort Wayne.

(2) New Jersey Nets vs. (6) Boston Celtics

This was the second playoff meeting between these two teams, with the Nets winning the first meeting.

Western Conference semifinals

(1) San Antonio Spurs vs. (5) Los Angeles Lakers

 In Game 5, the Lakers nearly overcame a 25-point deficit, but Robert Horry's potential game-winning 3 went in and out.

This was the ninth playoff meeting between these two teams, with the Lakers winning six of the first eight meetings.

(2) Sacramento Kings vs. (3) Dallas Mavericks

This was the second playoff meeting between these two teams, with the Kings winning the first meeting.

Conference finals

Eastern Conference finals

(1) Detroit Pistons vs. (2) New Jersey Nets

 Jason Kidd hit the game-winning jumper with 1.4 seconds left in Game 1.

This was the second playoff meeting between these two teams, with the Pistons winning the first meeting.

Western Conference finals

(1) San Antonio Spurs vs. (3) Dallas Mavericks

Steve Kerr puts on a shooting performance for the ages connecting on 4 3-pointers closing out Dallas in game 6. Dirk Nowitzki missed the final three games with a knee injury.

This was the second playoff meeting between these two teams, with the Spurs winning the first meeting.

NBA Finals (W1) San Antonio Spurs vs. (E2) New Jersey Nets

Game 6 is David Robinson's final NBA game.
The Spurs become the first team to win all playoff series in 6 games.

This was the first NBA playoff meeting between the Nets and the Spurs. As members of the ABA, both teams met in the 1976 ABA Semifinals, where the Nets won 4–3.

References

External links
 NBA.com's section for the 2003 NBA Playoffs

National Basketball Association playoffs
Playoffs
Sports in Portland, Oregon

fi:NBA-kausi 2002–2003#Pudotuspelit